Edward Johnston, CBE (11 February 1872 – 26 November 1944) was a British craftsman who is regarded, with Rudolf Koch, as the father of modern calligraphy, in the particular form of the broad-edged pen as a writing tool.

He is best known as the designer of Johnston, a sans-serif typeface that was used throughout the London Underground system  until the 1980s.  He also redesigned the famous roundel symbol used throughout the system.

Early life
Johnston was born in San José de Mayo, Uruguay.   His father, Fowell Buxton Johnston (born 1839), was an officer in the 3rd Dragoon Guards, and the younger son of Scottish MP Andrew Johnston and his second wife, abolitionist Priscilla Buxton, daughter of Sir Thomas Fowell Buxton, 1st Baronet.  Johnston's uncle (his father's elder brother), also Andrew Johnston, became an MP in Essex in the 1860s.

The family returned to England in 1875.  With his father seeking work, and his mother ill, Johnston was raised by an aunt.  He was educated at home, and enjoyed mathematics, technology, and creating illuminated manuscripts. His mother died in 1891, and he began to work for an uncle.  He spent some time studying medicine at Edinburgh University but did not complete the course.

After his mother's death, his father was remarried, to a sister of Robert Chalmers, 1st Baron Chalmers.  Johnston's half-brother, Andrew Johnston (1897–1917), was killed when his aeroplane crashed while serving in the Royal Flying Corps in the First World War.

Career

After studying published copies of manuscripts by architect William Harrison Cowlishaw, and a handbook by Edward F. Strange, he was introduced to Cowlishaw in 1898 and then to William Lethaby, principal of the Central School of Arts and Crafts.  Lethaby advised him to study manuscripts at the British Museum, which encouraged Johnston to make his letters using a broad edged pen.

Lethaby also engaged Johnston to teach lettering, and he started teaching at the Central School in Southampton Row, London, in September 1899, where he influenced the typeface designer and sculptor Eric Gill.  From 1901 he also taught a class at the Royal College of Art and many students were inspired by his teachings.

He published a handbook, Writing & Illuminating, & Lettering in 1906.  He started a second book in the 1920s but it was unfinished at his death.

In 1913, Frank Pick commissioned him to design a typeface for London Underground, and the simple and clear sans-serif Johnston typeface was the result.

In 1913, Johnston was one of the editors of The Imprint, a periodical for the printing industry. For this paper, Monotype made a complete new font: Imprint, series 101, exclusively for use in The Imprint. Actually this was the first revival character font Monotype made. In the 9 issues of The Imprint, many articles about calligraphy were included.

He has also been credited for reviving the art of modern penmanship and lettering single-handedly through his books and teachings. Johnston also devised the simply crafted round calligraphic handwriting style, written with a broad pen, known today as the foundational hand (what Johnston originally called a slanted pen hand, which was developed from Roman and half-uncial forms).

He influenced a generation of British typographers and calligraphers, including Graily Hewitt, Irene Wellington, Harold Curwen and Stanley Morison, Alfred Fairbank, Florence Kingsford Cockerell, and Eric Gill.  He also influenced the transition from Gothic to Roman letters in Germany, and Anna Simons was a student.  He also lectured in Dresden in 1912. In 1921, students of Johnston founded the Society of Scribes & Illuminators (SSI), probably the world's foremost calligraphy society.

Not all his students were happy with his decision to create a sans-serif design for the Underground, in a style thought of as modernist and industrial. His pupil Graily Hewitt privately wrote to a friend:In Johnston I have lost confidence. Despite all he did for us...he has undone too much by forsaking his standard of the Roman alphabet, giving the world, without safeguard or explanation, his block letters which disfigure our modern life. His prestige has obscured their vulgarity and commercialism.

Johnston also created a blackletter-influenced design for a 1929 German edition of Hamlet.

Private life
He met Greta Grieg, a Scottish schoolmistress, in 1900, and they were married in 1903.  They had three daughters.  They lived in London until moving, in 1912, to Ditchling, Sussex, where Eric Gill had settled in 1907.  His wife died in 1936.  He was appointed a CBE in 1939.  He died at home in Ditchling, and is buried in St Margaret's churchyard.

Edward Johnston Memorial in Farringdon Station
On 24 June 2019 a memorial was erected at Farringdon Station for Edward Johnston and his underground alphabet. Huge woodtype was mounted on the wall of the underground station, to celebrate Edward and his type.

Publications

 
 
 
 
 
 First publication of this text appeared in "The Imprint", 1913, vol. 1: pp. 7–14, vol. 2: pp. 128–133

References

Further reading
 Holliday, Peter (2007). Edward Johnston: Master Calligrapher. London: British Library Publishing. .
 Johnston, Priscilla (1959, 1976), Edward Johnston, Pentalic Corporation, New York, N.Y.

External links

 The Legacy of Edward Johnston at www.ejf.org.uk The Edward Johnston Foundation
 Edward Johnston's works held at the Central Saint Martins Museum and Study Collection
 Edward Johnston at the Crafts Study Centre
 National Portrait Gallery Edward Johnston, 1937
  Example of condensed form Johnston font used on a bus blind
 Edward Johnston Collection held by the Crafts Study Centre and hosted online by the Visual Arts Data Service (VADS)
 Ditchling Museum of Art + Craft holds many Edward Johnston works and personal effects
 Underground: 100 Years of Edward Johnston's Lettering for London exhibition at Ditchling Museum of Art + Craft March - September 2016
   Writing & Illuminating & Lettering, 8th edition 1917 is online at The Internet Archive in various formats PDF, Plain Text, DAISY, ePub and Kindle]

1872 births
1944 deaths
People from San José de Mayo
British calligraphers
British graphic designers
British typographers and type designers
Academics of the Royal College of Art
People associated with transport in London
Commanders of the Order of the British Empire
Academics of the Central School of Art and Design
Transport design in London
History of the London Underground
Alumni of the University of Edinburgh
Uruguayan people of British descent